DXJC-TV (channel 35) is a television station in Cagayan de Oro City, Philippines, airing programming from the GMA network. Owned and operated by the network's namesake corporate parent, the station maintains studios at the 2/F Centro Mariano Bldg., Sergio Osmeña St., Brgy. 31, Cagayan de Oro, while DXJC-TV's hybrid analog and digital transmitting facility is located at the GMA Transmitter Site, Malasag Heights, Brgy. Cugman, Cagayan de Oro (sharing facilities with Barangay FM 100.7).

The network invested PhP 200 million for the upgrade of the station's studios and facilities and was launched January 23, 2013 (with the branding GMA Northern Mindanao) in time for the 2013 midterm elections. On February 5, 2013, the frequency moved to Channel 35, together with the launch of the Cebuano-language newscast Testigo Northern Mindanao. GMA Channel 35 is the flagship station of GMA Northern Mindanao, with relay stations in Dipolog, Pagadian, Ozamiz and Bukidnon, as well as parts of Lanao del Norte, Lanao del Sur, Caraga region, Misamis Oriental, Misamis Occidental, Camiguin, Zamboanga del Norte, Zamboanga del Sur, Southern Bohol, Basilan, Sulu, Tawi-Tawi and Zamboanga Sibugay.

History
GMA Cagayan de Oro began its operations in 1975 on Channel 12 under the call letters DXDZ-TV; a year after RBS were sold to a triumvirate composed of Felipe Gozon, Gilberto Duavit Sr. and Menardo Jimenez. At the same time, DXDZ-TV Channel 12 was launched under the ownership of RBS with the variant of the GMA Radio-Television Arts identification, though Republic Broadcasting System remained as its corporate name 14 years later. The network relaunched aside from sporting a light blue square logo with the network name in white, also had the using of the circle 12 logo, in its final years the blue circle 12 logo used was similar to those used by the ABC in some United States cities and later used the rainbow colors of red, yellow, green and blue stripes.

On April 30, 1992, following the network's expansion of coverage, DXDZ-TV Channel 12 was introduced of the Rainbow Satellite network launch, which commences its nationwide satellite broadcast to bring live broadcasts from Manila-sourced national programmings via DZBB-TV, GMA's flagship TV station in Manila, to viewers in the Northern Mindanao region, with the utilizes a new logo to correspond with the rebranding and a satellite-beaming rainbow in a multicolored striped based on the traditional scheme of red, orange, yellow, green, blue, indigo and violet, with GMA in a metallic form uses a San Serif Century Gothic Extra Font and analogous gloominess of Indigo as its fonts in the letters. GMA revamped between 1995 and 1998, while the latter revived the slogan, Where You Belong.

On October 27, 2002, during an episode of its noontime variety show SOP, GMA received a new logo as part of becoming a Kapuso Network launched.

In 2009, GMA Cagayan de Oro became a satellite station in Northern Mindanao after Bacolod, General Santos and Naga. At that time, the station's former studio is based at the 2/F Hotel Conchita Bldg., at the corner of Guillermo and Yacapin Sts.

In 2012, GMA Cagayan de Oro launched its relay station via Channel 35 with its public affairs program Northern Mindanao Isyu Karon. Prior to this, the frequency used to be launched QTV/Q, GMA Network's sister channel, on November 11, 2005, which later became GMA News TV on February 28, 2011.

On January 23, 2013, GMA Cagayan de Oro was upgraded to a "super station" and it was called GMA Northern Mindanao in its branding. It can be watch/seen in Cagayan de Oro, the provinces of Bukidnon, Camiguin, Misamis Occidental and Oriental, parts of Bohol, Lanao del Norte, Lanao del Sur and Compostela Valley along with North and South Cotabato, Sultan Kudarat, Agusan del Norte and Sur, Surigao del Norte and Sur, Zamboanga del Sur and Maguindanao.

On February 5, 2013, GMA Northern Mindanao transferred its frequency to Channel 35 with the launched of its flagship local newscast Testigo Northern Mindanao, while its sister channel GMA News TV moved to the then-newly frequency Channel 43 at the same day.

On November 10, 2014, following changes of its now-main newscast 24 Oras, GMA Northern Mindanao re-launched its flagship local newscast 24 Oras Northern Mindanao. However, that change suddenly cuts short when the newscast was abruptly cancelled on April 24, 2015, after more than two years of broadcast due to the strategic streamlining happened to all provincial stations of the network. Following the cancellation was the retrenchment of its staff and personalities and the closure of the network's regional news department. The station now delivers local programs from Manila via DZBB-TV Channel 7.

On August 28, 2017, after a two-year hiatus on producing local newscast, GMA Northern Mindanao began to co-producing and simulcasting the first ever Mindanao-wide newscast One Mindanao. This led to the station becoming a semi-satellite from GMA TV-5 Davao.

On December 15, 2020, GMA Northern Mindanao commenced digital test broadcasts on UHF Channel 47 covering Metro CDO and the provinces of Misamis Oriental and Camiguin, as well as several parts of Bukidnon.

Currently aired local programs
One Mindanao (Co-produced with GMA Davao)
At Home with GMA Regional TV (Co-produced with GMA Davao)
 Word of God Network

Previously aired local programs
Northern Mindanao Isyu Karon (2012-2013; simulcast from TV-12 Cagayan de Oro)
Isyu ug Istorya
Testigo Northern Mindanao
24 Oras Northern Mindanao - defunct flagship regional newscast, cancelled due to streamlining of regional operations
Biyaheng DO30 (2016-2022)

Digital television

Digital channels
UHF Channel 47 (671.143 MHz)

Areas of coverage

Primary areas  
 Cagayan de Oro
 Misamis Oriental

Secondary areas 
 Camiguin
 Portion of Bukidnon

Personalities

Present 
Cyril Chaves as Co-Anchor and Regional News Producer of One Mindanao and Co-Host of At Home with GMA Regional TV
PJ Dela Peña as Senior Desk Manager of One Mindanao
James Paolo Yap as Regional News Producer of One Mindanao

Past 
Raf Benaldo
Poch Sarballon
Dolly Ilogon-Talag
Kristine Joyce Vega
Mara Hiyasmin Rivera
Ralph Gerona
Nef Luczon
Sylvia Aguhob
Kenneth Ragpala 
Joe Legaspina
Jeik Compo 
Joane Tabique-Abesamis 
Kaye Mercado 
Francis Damit
Christian Gonzales
Emily Rafols
Pia Abas
Jacky Cabatuan
Brecil Kempis
Clyde Macascas
Ethel Ipanag

Rebroadcasters

GMA Cagayan de Oro's programmings were seen in eight relay/rebroadcasting stations in northern Mindanao. Since the return of GMA Cagayan de Oro as an already originating station last August 28, 2017, the operations of GMA Cagayan de Oro (TV-35 Cagayan de Oro) absorbed by GMA Davao which led to simulcast One Mindanao and other regional interstitial, as well as some of the editorial and reportorial staff are employed by the latter. The Cagayan de Oro station was previously operated as an originating station from 2010 to 2015, with its former programs Northern Mindanao Isyu Karon and Testigo Northern Mindanao/24 Oras Northern Mindanao.

See also
 List of GMA Network stations

References

GMA Network stations
Digital television stations in the Philippines
Television stations in Cagayan de Oro
Television channels and stations established in 2005